The Ökumenische Heiligenlexikon (ÖHL) or Ecumenical Lexicon of Saints is an independent, ecumenical, private internet project by Protestant priest Joachim Schäfer, from Stuttgart, which aims to publish information on the lives of saints and other "holy people".

Lexicon 
The lexicon is the largest and most comprehensive online repository of information on saints and other people considered blessed or holy. The basis of the collection are sources that are generally accessible, especially reprinted church history works. One aim is to edit out conflicting and false information, without making any claim to be scholarly. Volunteers with relevant expertise help the project with information and check articles for correction.

The Ökumenische Heiligenlexikon is available on the Internet, CD ROMs and other electronic data devices. No book publications are planned.

References

External links 
 Joachim Schäfer: Ökumenisches Heiligenlexikon
 Carola Nathan: Ökumenisches Heiligenlexikon, Review at Monumente online, Deutsche Stiftung Denkmalschutz, December 2013.
 The Heiligenlexikon on SWR1 Radio
 The Heiligenlexikon in the SWR Landesschau

Christian encyclopedias
Heiligenlexikon
Religious biographical dictionaries
German online encyclopedias
21st-century encyclopedias